Montelongo is a comune (municipality) in the Province of Campobasso in the Italian region Molise, located about  northeast of Campobasso.

Montelongo borders the following municipalities: Bonefro, Montorio nei Frentani, Rotello, Santa Croce di Magliano.

See also
 Molise Croats

References

Cities and towns in Molise